A network administrator is a person designated in an organization whose responsibility includes maintaining computer infrastructures with emphasis on local area networks (LANs) up to wide area networks (WANs). Responsibilities may vary between organizations, but installing new hardware, on-site servers, enforcing licensing agreements, software-network interactions as well as network integrity and resilience are some of the key areas of focus.

Duties 
The role of the network administrator can vary significantly depending on an organization's size, location, and socioeconomic considerations. Some organizations work on a user-to-technical support ratio,

Network administrators are often involved in proactive work. This type of work will often include:
 network monitoring.
 testing the network for weakness.
 keeping an eye out for needed updates.
 installing and implementing security programs.
 in many cases, E-mail and Internet filters.
 evaluating implementing network.

Network administrators are responsible for making sure that computer hardware and network infrastructure related to an organization's data network are effectively maintained. In smaller organizations, they are typically involved in the procurement of new hardware, the rollout of new software, maintaining disk images for new computer installs, making sure that licenses are paid for and up to date for software that needs it, maintaining the standards for server installations and applications, monitoring the performance of the network, checking for security breaches, and poor data management practices. A common question for the small-medium business (SMB) network administrator is, how much bandwidth do I need to run my business? Typically, within a larger organization, these roles are split into multiple roles or functions across various divisions and are not actioned by the one individual. In other organizations, some of these roles mentioned are carried out by system administrators.

As with many technical roles, network administrator positions require a breadth of technical knowledge and the ability to learn the intricacies of new networking and server software packages quickly.  Within smaller organizations, the more senior role of network engineer is sometimes attached to the responsibilities of the network administrator.  It is common for smaller organizations to outsource this function.

See also
 Network analyzer (disambiguation)
 Network architecture
 Network management system
 System administrator
 Technical support

References

Computer occupations
Management by type